Harris–Stowe State University (HSSU) is a historically black public university in St. Louis, Missouri. The university offers 50 majors, minors, and certificate programs in education, business, and arts & sciences. It is a member-school of the Thurgood Marshall College Fund.  It is immediately east of the Saint Louis University campus. The school enrolled 1,630 students in 2019.

History
In 1857, St. Louis Public Schools established a normal school (teaching college) for white students; it was subsequently named Harris Teachers College, after William Torrey Harris, a former St. Louis superintendent of schools and United States Commissioner of Education. In 1863 philosopher Anna Brackett became principal of the school, and it became the first normal school led by a woman in the United States. In 1920, it was authorized to issue a four-year Bachelor of Arts in Education degree.

In 1890, the St. Louis school system established Sumner Normal School to train black teachers.  In 1929, its name was changed to Stowe Teachers College, after author Harriet Beecher Stowe, whose novel, Uncle Tom's Cabin, had promoted the abolitionist cause in the antebellum United States.

The U.S. Supreme Court's 1954 decision in Brown v. Board of Education mandated integration of public school systems.  In response to this, Harris and Stowe Colleges were merged into one institution, which retained the "Harris Teachers College" name.  At the behest of Stowe alumni and other St. Louisans, the name "Stowe" was added, and the school became Harris-Stowe College.

In 1979, the college was added to the state system of public higher education, under the name of Harris-Stowe State College.  Its four-year education degree was changed to a Bachelor of Science in Education.  It subsequently expanded its programs to offer several new degrees in education, including the B.S. in Urban Education, designed to enable non-teaching urban education personnel to address problems specific to urban schools; and a degree in Business Administration with various professional options.

In 2005, the college attained university status, and was renamed Harris–Stowe State University.

Academics and accreditation

Academics
The Department of Academic Affairs comprises three academic units:
 Anheuser-Busch School of Business
 College of Arts & Sciences
 College of Education

All degree programs at Harris-Stowe begin with general education studies. Then upper-level courses concentrate on disciplinary studies.

William L. Clay, Sr. Early Childhood Development/Parenting Education Center
The William L. Clay, Sr. Early Childhood Development/Parenting Education Center is an early childhood child care center located on campus. Harris-Stowe invested $11 million into the new facility to train early learning professionals, provide parenting education, and offer high quality day care for children. Harris-Stowe was awarded an FY09 Area Resources for Community and Human Services (ARCHS) start-up and expansion grant to assist in the purchase of developmentally appropriate materials for the center's new infant/toddler rooms.

Accreditation
Harris–Stowe State University is accredited by the Higher Learning Commission of the North Central Association of Colleges and Schools. The Anheuser-Busch School of Business receives additional accreditation through the Association of Collegiate Business Schools and Programs and the International Assembly for Collegiate Business Education. The School of Education receives additional accreditation through the National Council for Accreditation of Teacher Education.

Ranking
Harris-Stowe State University is ranked #55-#70 in Regional Colleges Midwest in 2020 by U S News & World Report.

Student activities

Student organizations
The Office of Student Engagement sponsors or hosts more than thirty activities or special interest clubs and approximately a dozen academic clubs and honor societies, several campus affiliate chapters of national organizations, and nearly 12 Greek organizations (mostly in conjunction with other St. Louis area colleges and universities).

Academic organizations
 Sigma Alpha Pi National Honor Society
 Alpha Chi Honor Society
 Accounting Students Association
 Kappa Delta Pi
 Kappa Mu Epsilon (Math Honor Society)
 Delta Mu Delta

Athletics
The Harris–Stowe State athletic teams are called the Hornets. The university is a member of the National Association of Intercollegiate Athletics (NAIA), primarily competing in the American Midwest Conference (AMC) since the 1986–87 academic year. Their mascot is the Hornet. 

Harris–Stowe State competes in 12 intercollegiate varsity sports: Men's sports include baseball, basketball, soccer and track & field (indoor and outdoor); while women's sports include basketball, soccer, softball, track & field (indoor and outdoor) and volleyball; and co-ed sports include cheerleading.

Men's basketball
The Harris–Stowe State men's basketball team won the American Midwest Conference tournament championship in 2017 and 2018.

Notable alumni
 Arlene Ackerman, former superintendent of public schools in District of Columbia, San Francisco and Philadelphia
 John Burton (1910–1992), first African-American mayor in Michigan
 Cori Bush, Representative for Missouri's 1st congressional district
 David S. Cunningham, Jr., Los Angeles, California, City Council member, 1973–87
 Kimberly Gardner, reformist prosecutor in City of St. Louis
 Julius Hunter, retired television anchorman, former St. Louis University vice-president, author
 Bobby Wilks, U.S. Coast Guard aviator, first African-American promoted to Captain in the Coast Guard
 DJ Tab, hip hop DJ, record producer, and entrepreneur

References

External links

 
 Official athletics website

 
University and college buildings on the National Register of Historic Places in Missouri
Tudor Revival architecture in Missouri
Public universities and colleges in Missouri
Historically black universities and colleges in the United States
Universities and colleges in St. Louis
Educational institutions established in 1857
1857 establishments in Missouri
National Register of Historic Places in St. Louis
Buildings and structures in St. Louis